Emigi (also Romanized as Emīgī; also known as Chūkhūn) is a village in Jakdan Rural District, in the Central District of Bashagard County, Hormozgan Province, Iran. At the 2006 census, its population was 484, in 120 families.

References 

Populated places in Bashagard County